Kymberly Douglas (née Bankier; born 1959) is an American television personality, actress, and blogger. She is best known for her guest starring roles in L. A. Law (1991), In Living Color (1993), Retired at 35 (2011), and The Bold and the Beautiful (2017). From 1985 until his death in 2021, she was married to The Young and the Restless actor Jerry Douglas. As a blogger, she has been quoted as a beauty and lifestyle expert by several publications and has been open about her struggles with breast cancer.

References 

1959 births
Living people
American television personalities
American actresses
American bloggers